The 1989 Montana State Bobcats football team was an American football team that represented Montana State University in the Big Sky Conference during the 1989 NCAA Division I-AA football season. In their third season under head coach Earle Solomonson, the Bobcats compiled a 4–7 record (2–6 against Big Sky opponents) and tied for sixth place in the Big Sky.

Schedule

References

Montana State
Montana State Bobcats football seasons
Montana State Bobcats football